Robert Brown Robertson Gebbie (born 18 November 1934) is a Scottish former professional footballer who  played as a goalkeeper in the Scottish League for Queen of the South and in the English Football League for Bradford Park Avenue. He also played for junior club Blantyre Victoria and in English non-league football for Morecambe.

References

1934 births
Living people
Sportspeople from Cambuslang
Scottish footballers
Association football goalkeepers
Blantyre Victoria F.C. players
Queen of the South F.C. players
Bradford (Park Avenue) A.F.C. players
Morecambe F.C. players
Scottish Junior Football Association players
Scottish Football League players
English Football League players
Footballers from South Lanarkshire